The 2023 USA Indoor Track and Field Championships were held at Albuquerque Convention Center in Albuquerque, New Mexico. Organized by USA Track and Field (USATF), the three-day competition took place from February 16 to February 18 and served as the national championships in track and field for the United States.

Male Track medalist

Male Field medalist

Female Track medalist

Female Field medalist

Qualification
The 2023 USA Indoor Track and Field Championships serve as the national championship meet for United States. The 2023 World Athletics Indoor Championships were cancelled in the summer of 2022 due to COVID-19 restrictions in the host country, China.

Defending World Champions
 Grant Holloway - 60 m hurdles
 Ajeé Wilson - 800 m
 Sandi Morris - pole vault

Defending World Tour Winner
 Elijah Hall - 60 m

Schedule

Entry Standards
Events in bold will be contested at the Championships.

January 1, 2022 – February 11, 2023 window.

References

External links
 2023 USATF Indoor Track and Field Championships Home Page

2023
Track and field indoor
USA Indoor Track and Field Championships
USA Indoor Track and Field Championships
Sports in Albuquerque, New Mexico
Track and field in New Mexico
Events in Albuquerque, New Mexico